The University College of Estate Management (abbreviated to UCEM), formerly the College of Estate Management (CEM) is an independent UK-based higher education institution which provides courses by distance learning for people in the real estate development and construction industries throughout the world. UCEM is also one of eight original members of the Independent Universities Group, made up of universities not funded by the HEFCE. As of 2013, UCEM had educated over 150,000 students.

History 

The College of Estate Management was founded in 1919 by the "Chartered Auctioneers' and Estate Agent's Institute" (which later became the Royal Institution of Chartered Surveyors, RICS). The college was formed specifically to serve the property-related estate management and construction industry sectors. The scale of British lives lost in the First World War had led to a shortage of trained staff to manage the country's estates. In 1938 the College gained recognition from the University of London to provide tuition for its internal degree. An association with the University of Reading goes back to 1967 and the College relocated from Kensington in London to the University of Reading's Whiteknights Campus in 1972.

UCEM is an independent self-funded charity. It was granted Taught Degree Awarding Powers in its own right by the Privy Council in January 2013. On 11 November 2015, CEM was awarded university college status by the Privy Council and changed its name to the University College of Estate Management.
In September 2013, the college appointed Ashley Wheaton as its ninth Principal, taking over the role from Ann Heywood, who retired.

Formerly located at the University of Reading's Whiteknights Campus, UCEM moved premises in September 2016 to 60 Queens Road, Reading, Berkshire.
The Prince of Wales has been patron of UCEM from 1998 to present (2020). In March 2019, to celebrate the University's centenary year of existence, Prince Charles visited the UCEM building in Reading, to meet students and staff. (See Talk)

Courses and qualifications offered 

A large variety of courses are offered, including programmes accredited by professional bodies such as the RICS and the Chartered Institute of Building.
UCEM diploma or degree courses include (to Nov 2014) surveying practice, building surveying, construction management, estate management, property management, quantity surveying, shopping centre management, construction and real estate.
At any one time the University College of Estate Management has between 3500 and 4000 students participating from over 100 different countries.

Alumni 

Notable alumni include:

 Albert Costain – Conservative MP Folkestone & Hythe 1959–1983 
 Irene Barclay – first woman in Britain to qualify as a chartered surveyor, following the passage of the Sex Disqualification Removal Act 1919. She was an active social reformer, focusing on improving housing conditions in the St Pancras slums in London between the First and Second World Wars for which she received an OBE. 1894–1989.

 Alison Nimmo – chief executive of the Crown Estate 2012 - 2019; 
 Angus MacDonald – Scottish SNP MSP (since 2011)
 Baron Mais – former Lord Mayor of London 1972–1973
 Desmond Plummer – former English Conservative politician and the longest serving Leader of the Greater London Council 1967 - 1973 
 Gerald Bowden – Conservative MP Dulwich 1983–1992
 Sir John Henry Ritblat – honorary president and formerly chairman and CEO of The British Land Company PLC
 Paul Morrell – Government Chief Construction Adviser Nov 2009-Nov 2012
 William Hurst Rees – original editor of "Valuation: Principles into Practice" [1st Edition 1978] (a leading handbook for students on UK valuation)
 Robbie Moore – Conservative MP for Keighley since 2019.

Research 

The College of Estate Management conducts independent, applied research within the industries it serves, which is available as a resource to students and alumni.

References

External links 
 UCEM 
 RICS 

Education in Reading, Berkshire
Reading
Educational institutions established in 1919
1919 establishments in England